Petite-Synthe is a former commune of the Nord département in northern France.

The commune of Saint-Pol-sur-Mer was created in 1877, by its territory being detached from Petite-Synthe. In 1971 the commune of Dunkerque absorbed Petite-Synthe and Rosendaël. In 1980, a large part of Petite-Synthe was detached from Dunkerque and merged into Grande-Synthe.

Heraldry

References

Dunkirk
Former communes of Nord (French department)
French Flanders